Miller Thomson LLP is a national business law firm with approximately 525 lawyers across 5 provinces in Canada. The firm offers a full range of services in litigation and disputes, and provides business law expertise in mergers and acquisitions, corporate finance and securities, financial services, tax, restructuring and insolvency, trade, real estate, labour and employment as well as a host of other specialty areas. Miller Thomson offices are located in Vancouver, Calgary, Edmonton, Regina, Saskatoon, London, Waterloo Region, Toronto, Vaughan and Montréal.

Rankings & Recognition

Miller Thomson LLP lawyers are consistently ranked among the leading practitioners in the country. 

The firm is recognized in the 2023 edition of the highly regarded Chambers Canada Guide, earning a top Band 1 ranking in Charities/Non-profits and Agribusiness: Agriculture & Food Products and noted as a leading firm in the areas of Construction, Environmental, Retail, Transportation (Rail & Road), Employment & Labour (Ontario), General Business Law (Saskatchewan) and Real Estate (Alberta). The firm also ranks Band 1 for Private Wealth Management Law – Canada in the 2022 edition of the Chambers High Net Worth Guide".

Miller Thomson also had over 176 lawyers recognized for their expertise across 48 areas of law, including 3 who were awarded “Lawyer of the Year” in the 2023 edition of The Best Lawyers in Canada.

Strategic Affiliations
Miller Thomson is a member of Multilaw, a global legal network with 90 member firms in more than 100 countries.

In 2012, Miller Thomson entered an affiliation agreement with leading French business law firm FIDAL, solidifying a relationship first initiated two years prior.

References

External links 
 Miller Thomson's website

Law firms of Canada
Law firms established in 1957